Duboscia is a small plant genus, with two species, in the family Malvaceae. The genus occurs from the Ivory Coast to the Democratic Republic of Congo. The genus was previously in the Tiliaceae, under the APG classification it is now placed in the Malvaceae.

The genus was first described by Henri Théophile Bocquillon in 1866.

References

Grewioideae
Flora of Africa
Malvaceae genera